The National Independent Cadres and Elites (NICE) is an Iraqi political party.  It represents Shi'ites who do not support the approach of the United Iraqi Alliance.  It is closely associated with the movement of Moqtada al-Sadr and the Mahdi Army.  The party is led by newspaper editor Fatah al-Sheikh.

2005 Transitional elections
In the 2005 Iraqi elections, NICE received just under 70,000 votes, about 0.8% of those cast, earning them three seats in the transitional National Assembly of Iraq.

2005 Permanent elections
NICE did not contest the elections for the regular assembly later in 2005. Many of Sadr's supporters were part of the United Iraqi Alliance list.

References

Political parties in Iraq